The Education and Science Workers’ Union (GEW) is a trade union in Germany. It has a membership of 280,343 and is one of eight industrial affiliates of the German Confederation of Trade Unions.
Most members are teachers, but it also represents day care workers, social workers, private educators, researchers and professors.

GEW is founding member of the Berlin Energy Table which successfully pushed for a Referendum on the recommunalization of energy supply in Berlin in 2013.

Trusts

Fair Childhood
A charitable trust founded by the trades union GEW with the mission to use education to fight child labour ("Bildung statt Kinderarbeit").

Presidents
1947: Max Traeger
1952: Bernhard Plewe
1958: Max Traeger
1960: Heinrich Rodenstein
1968: Erich Frister
1981: Dieter Wunder
1997: Eva-Maria Stange
2005: Ulrich Thöne
2013: Marlis Tepe
2021: Maike Finnern

References

External links

www.gew.de
www.fair-childhood.eu

German Trade Union Confederation
Education trade unions
Trade unions in Germany
Trade unions established in 1948